NGC 6293 is a globular cluster located in the constellation Ophiuchus. Its Shapley–Sawyer Concentration Class is IV. It was discovered by the American astronomer Lewis A. Swift on 8 July 1885.

See also 
 List of NGC objects (6001–7000)
 List of NGC objects

References

External links 
 

Globular clusters
6293
Ophiuchus (constellation)